Bani Mansour is a sub-district located in As Sudah District, 'Amran Governorate, Yemen. Bani Mansour had a population of 10092 according to the 2004 census.

References 

Sub-districts in As Sudah District